Medieval Madness is a Williams pinball machine released in June 1997. Designed by Brian Eddy and programmed by Lyman Sheats, it had a production run of 4,016 units. As of April 3, 2022, the Pinside pinball community lists it as the #2 highest-ranked pinball machine (behind the 2021 Godzilla machine by Stern); many adherents consider it the greatest of all time.

In 2014 Planetary Pinball Supply produced a new production of the game, Medieval Madness Remake, selling for US$7,995.

Playfield
The centerpiece of the playfield is an animated castle with a solenoid-controlled portcullis and motorized drawbridge. One of the game's primary objectives is to "destroy" six castles by hitting the castle's entryway with the pinball. A specific number of hits will lower the drawbridge, exposing the portcullis; additional hits will cause the portcullis to rise, and shooting the ball into the castle entrance generates an explosion effect on the dot matrix display, a lightshow, and a sizable award of points. Medieval Madness also features two Trolls, animated targets that are normally concealed below the playfield, but can pop up during certain gameplay modes. Other objectives can be scored by shooting the left and right ramps, the left and right orbits, and the catapult ramp in the lower left corner of the playfield. The game's ramps introduced a patented feature that would prevent a failed ramp shot from draining straight down the middle between the flippers.

Gameplay
Missions:
In order to get to the Wizard Mode "Battle for the Kingdom" one has to achieve the following goals:
 Joust Champion: Shooting the loop(s) advances Joust and finally lights Joust Madness.
 Patron of Peasants: Shooting the left ramp advances the Peasants and finally lights Peasant Madness.
 Catapult Ace: Shoot the catapult to shoot various items at the castle (Catapult Madness).
 Defender of Damsels: Shoot up the right ramp to advance the Damsel. The final shot up the tower lights Damsel Madness.
 Master of Trolls: Light the Trolls by hitting the targets in front of the castle. Collect the Trolls in "Merlin's Magic" and finish them off by three shots at the head each to light Troll Madness.
 Castle Crusher: Destroy the castle.
All these goals have to be repeated several times to get the corresponding insert in front of the castle to light up.

Multiballs:
 Castle Multiball: Light the Lock at the broad side (hole to the left of the castle gate) and lock three balls (same hole).  Once activated, the player must shoot either ramp five times to collect the jackpot (denoted by Payne Guards).  After all five jackpots have been claimed, the broad side hole lights up, and sinking it scores the Super Jackpot and an Extra Ball.  The remaining jackpot ramps light up and the player can continue collecting the Super Jackpots.  Once all the Super Jackpots have been claimed, the multiball reverts to the guards.
 Multiball Madness: Each of the sub-missions (except for "Castle Crusher") can light an insert in front of "Merlin's Magic". Collecting at least one can start the Multiball by shooting into "Merlin's Magic":  In this phase, all the jackpot ramps are lit and the player can score Jackpots by shooting the lit ramps.  If a player hits a ramp that is denoted by a completed sub-mission, the player would score a Super Jackpot instead.  If the player shoots the broad side hole, a Double Super Jackpot would be awarded instead.  For each madness completed, the number of balls is denoted as follows:
 Single Madness: 2 Balls.
 Two to Four Madnesses: 3 Balls.
 Five Madnesses: 4 Balls.
 Barnyard Multiball: Shoot all catapult items at the castle.
 Battle for the Kingdom This two-phased Wizard Mode starts once the player pockets the ball in the castle, with four balls on the playing field.  In the first phase, the player has to score all the Battle Jackpots by hitting the madness targets. Once all the Battle Jackpots have been scored, the second phase of the mode starts and the player must hit the castle gate seven times, and get inside to score the final jackpot. Unless the player has any "Troll Bombs", two trolls will be in the way of the gate making hitting the gate very challenging. If the player succeeds in scoring the final jackpot, all remaining balls are drained and the display shows the King of Payne's demise and Merlin announces you are the new King of the realm, and the game continues, also for the rest of the current ball, all major shots are lit for victory laps.

Music and voices
The music and sounds for this game were composed by Dan Forden. Much of the game's dialogue was written by Scott Adsit and Kevin Dorff, at the time members of The Second City in Chicago. Adsit also provided voice work alongside fellow Second City member Tina Fey.

Tina Fey and Andrea Farrell provided the voices of the various princesses (one of which has a "valley girl" accent), while Greg Freres provided the voices of the jousting announcer and one of the trolls, and Vince Pontarelli provided the voices of Francois Du Grimm and the other troll. The rest of the male voices, including the various knights and the Wizard were provided by Scott Adsit and Kevin Dorff.

Reception
It was an immediate critical success, earning well on location and achieving widespread popularity among collectors. Demand for the machine soon outstripped supply significantly; as of 2005, Medieval Madness machines often sell for prices well in excess of $8,000, sometimes much higher if in pristine condition (the game sold new for about $3,000 in 1997). Many players consider it to be the greatest pinball machine of all time.

Digital versions
Medieval Madness is included as part of the Williams volume 1 tables for Pinball FX 3 on October 9, 2018. It was previously available as downloadable content for The Pinball Arcade until June 30, 2018, when all Williams tables were removed due to licensing issues. Medieval Madness is also a playable table in the Xbox 360 and PlayStation 3 versions Pinball Hall of Fame: The Williams Collection, and was also included in the arcade game UltraPin.

Remake
In 2013, the Chicago Gaming Company released two editions of the classic Williams title: Medieval Madness Remake, and Medieval Madness Remake Limited Edition. Both editions of the game include LED lighting on the playfield and a new color display.

See also
Black Knight
Black Knight 2000

References

External links
 Internet Pinball Database entry for Medieval Madness

Williams pinball machines
1997 pinball machines